Trilogy is the third studio album by guitarist Yngwie Malmsteen, released on 4 November 1986 through Polydor Records. The album reached No. 44 on the US Billboard 200 and charted within the top 60 in the Netherlands and Sweden. In the liner notes, Malmsteen dedicates the album to the memory of the late Swedish prime minister Olof Palme, who was assassinated on 28 February 1986.

Critical reception

Steve Huey at AllMusic gave Trilogy four stars out of five, calling it Malmsteen's second best album after his 1984 debut Rising Force. Malmsteen's compositional and lyrical skills were described as being at their peak on Trilogy, while his guitar work was praised as "jaw-droppingly fast and technically demanding". Huey listed "Dark Ages", "You Don't Remember, I'll Never Forget" and "Trilogy Suite Op: 5" as highlights.

Track listing

Personnel
Yngwie Malmsteen – guitar, Moog Taurus, bass, conducting, arrangement, mixing, production
Mark Boals – vocals
Jens Johansson – keyboard, arrangement assistance (track 9; section 2)
Anders Johansson – drums
Ricky DeLena – engineering, mixing
Jimmy Hoyson – engineering assistance
Robin Levine – engineering assistance

Charts

Weekly charts

References

External links
Trilogy, 1986 at yngwiemalmsteen.com
In Review: Yngwie J. Malmsteen "Trilogy" at Guitar Nine Records

Yngwie Malmsteen albums
1986 albums
Polydor Records albums
Dragons in art